Sudhir Phadke (25 July 1919 – 29 July 2002) was an Indian singer-composer. He was regarded as an icon of the Marathi film industry and Marathi Sugam Sangeet (light music) for five decades. Apart from Marathi, Phadke sang and composed songs in several Hindi films as well.

Phadke's nickname was Babuji.

Life
Sudhir Phadke was born in Kolhapur on 25 July 1919. His birth name was Ram Phadke, but he later changed his name to 'Sudhir' when he composed a song for HMV. Phadke acquired his primary tutelage in vocal classical music from the late Vamanrao Padhye in Kolhapur. After beginning his career with HMV in 1941, he joined the Prabhat Film Company as music director in 1946. During his long career, he composed music for many Marathi and Hindi films. He was also an immaculate playback singer. Phadke married his fellow singer Lalita Deulkar. Their son Shridhar Phadke (born 1950) is also a composer and singer.

Geet Ramayana, based on poet G D Madgulkar's verses, is one of Phadke's most popular works. The programme ran on All India Radio for a year, 1955–56. Stage performances of the program continue to draw huge crowds even today. Phadke set to music all 56 songs, and they were sung by different singers for radio (Manik Varma, lalita Deulkar, Lata Mangeshkar, Phadke himself, Vasantrao Deshpande, Ram Phatak, Usha Atre). All 56 songs were also recorded in Phadke's own voice.

In his last days of life, Phadke was involved in producing a Hindi film on the life of the Indian freedom fighter Vinayak Damodar Savarkar. The movie Veer Savarkar was funded by public donations. Sudhir Phadke last sang and composed music for this movie.

He was also actively involved with Goa Freedom Movement and in post freedom fight of India.
Phadke was connected with Rashtriya Swayamsevak Sangh for over 60 years. He was the main inspiration and founder member of India Heritage Foundation in the United States.

Filmography

As a composer
(Partial filmography)

 Gokul (1946)
 Rukmini Swayamvar (1946)
 Aage Badho (1947)
 Sita Swayamwar (1948)
 Jivacha sakha (1948)
 Sita Swayanwar (1948)
 Vande Mataram (1948)
 Aparadhi (1949)
 Bheem (1949)
 Maya Baazar (1949)
 Ram Pratiggya (1949)
 Sant Janabai (1949)
 Shri Krishna Darshan (1950)
 Johar Maibap (1950)
 Pudhacha Paul (1950)
 Vanshacha Diva (1950)
 Jashas Tase (1951)
 Vithal Rakhmai (1951)
 Maalti Madhav (1951)
 Murli Wala (1951)
 Lakhaci Goshta (1952)
 May Bahini (1952)
 Narveer Tanaji (1952)
 Pratapgad (1952)
 Bolvita dhani (1953)
 Kon Kunacha (1953)
 Kuberacha Dhan (1953)
 Soubhagya (1953)
 Vahininchya bangadya(1953)
 Pehli Taarikh(1954)
 Ratna Ghar(1954)
 In meen sade teen(1954)
 Maharani Yesubai(1954)
 Un paus (1954)
 Owalni (1954)
 Postatil mulgi(1954)
 Rashmachya Gathi (1954)
 Shevagyachya Shenga (1955)
 Ganget ghoda nhala(1955)
 Mi tulas tuzhya angani(1955)
 Devghar (1956)
 Sajni (1956)
 Andhala magato ek dola (1956)
 Maza ghar mazi manasa(1956)
 Devagharcha lena (1957)
 Gharcha zala thoda(1957)
 Utavala narad(1957)
 Gaj Gauri (1958)
 Gokul Ka Chor (1959)
 Jagachya pathiwar(1960)
 Lagnala jato mi(1960)
 Umaj padel tar (1960)
 Bhabhi Ki Chudiyan (1961)
 Adhi kalas mag paya(1961)
 Kalanka Shobha(1961)
 Mazi Aai (1961)
 Nirupama ani parirani(1961)
 Prapancha(1961)
 Suwasini(1961)
 Pyar Ki Jeet (1962)
 Bhintila kaan astat(1962)
 Char divas sasuche char divas suneche(1962)
 Chimnyanchi shala(1962)
 Gariba gharachi lek(1962)
 Soniyachi paule(1962)
 Bayko maheri jate(1963)
 Ha maza marga ekla(1963)
 Te maze ghar(1963)
 Devacha khel (1964)
 Gurukilli(1966)
 Sant gora kumbhar(1967)
 Ekati (1968)
 Aamhi jaato amuchchya gaava(1968)
 Aadhar (1969)
 Dev manus (1970)
 Dhakti bahin(1970)
 Mumbaicha jawai (Marathi original of Basu Chatterjee Hindi language film Piya ka ghar)(1970)
 Zala mahar pandharinath (1970)
 Daraar (1971 film)
 Bajiraocha beta (1971)
 Zep (1971)
 Lakhat ashi dekhani (1971)
 Mi hi manus ahe(1971)
 Anolkhi(1973)
 Javai vikat ghene ahe (1973)
 Kartiki(1974)
 Jyotibacha navas (1975)
 Ya sukhano ya (1975)
 Aram haram ahe (1976)
 Chandra hota sakshila (1978)
 Dost asava tar asa(1978)
 Sher Shivaji (1981)
 Devghar Mar (1981)
 Aplech dat amplech oth (1982)
 Thorali Jau(1983)
 Chorachya manat chandane (1984)
 Maherchi manasa (1984)
 Dhakti soon (1986)
 Pudhacha paul (1986)
 Sher Shivaji (1987)
 Reshim gathi (1988)
 Veer Savarkar (Hindi) (2001)

Popular songs

Geet Ramayan
Composed and renditioned 'Geet Ramayan', 56 songs written by Madgulkar.
Geet Ramayan, collection of songs is summary of Indian epic of Ramayana in chronological sequence. The first of Geet Ramayan by Sudhir Phadke was broadcast by All India Radio Pune on Friday 1 April 1955 on the day of Raam Navami (celebration of the birth of Lord Rama). From 1 April 1955 for 56 weeks, every Sunday a new song of Geet Ramayana was broadcast.  It was one of the most popular programs of that time. Geet Ramayan has been translated in 9 Indian languages Assamese, Bengali, English, Hindi, Kannada, Konkani, Sindhi, Telugu and Oriya.

As a composer
 Jyoti kalash chalke (Bhabhi ki Chudiyan), a song based on Raga Bhupali sung by Lata Mangeshkar
 "Pehli Tarikh", sung by Kishor Kumar the song is till date played on Radio Ceylon-Sri Lanka Broadcasting Corporation on 1st of every month.
 Maratha Sphurti Geet the regimental song of Maratha Light Infantry, was composed and arranged for the military band by Sudhir Phadke. The lyrics were written by G. D. Madgulkar.
 Chahiye Ashish Madhav a homage to Second Sarsanghchalak Shri M S Golwalkar of the RSS.

Other major creations of Phadke include:
Ashi pakhare yeti,
Dev devharyat nahi,
Daav mandun mandun modu nako,
Vikat ghetla shyam,
Tujhe geet ganyasathi sur labhu de,
Toch chandrama nabhaat.

Awards
Phadke won numerous awards, including:
 National Film Award for Best Feature Film in Marathi at 11th National Film Awards (1963) for Ha Majha Marg Ekla.
 Sangeet Natak Akademi Award in 1991
 Sahyadri Swara Ratna Puraskar in April 2002, an award presented by DD Sahyadri

Death
He died in Mumbai on 29 July 2002 at 10.30 AM after suffering a brain haemorrhage. His body was kept at Veer Savarkar Memorial at Dadar in central Mumbai, where many admirers came to pay their last tributes.

A Flyover which goes over the railway line and Dahisar river in the Mumbai suburb between Borivali and Dahisar connecting east and west was named after him.

Bhandup Village Road in Mumbai suburb of Bhandup (West) was renamed as Sangeetkar Sudhir Phadke Marg by BMC.

References

1919 births
2002 deaths
Indian film score composers
Indian male playback singers
Marathi people
People from Kolhapur
Recipients of the Rashtrapati Award
Recipients of the Sangeet Natak Akademi Award
Marathi-language singers
Musicians from Maharashtra
Marathi playback singers
Goa liberation activists
20th-century Indian singers
Indian male film score composers
20th-century Indian male singers